= Saverio Adenie =

Surinamese footballer (born 1996)

Saverio Urvin Adenie (born 11 May 1996) is a Surinamese footballer who currently plays for KESK Leopoldsburg in Belgium and the Suriname national football team. He has so far capped five games with Suriname.
